Clube Esportivo Paysandu, commonly known as Paysandu, was a Brazilian football club based in Brusque, Santa Catarina state.

History
The club was founded on December 30, 1918 as Sport Club Paysandú. The club was eventually renamed to Clube Esportivo Paysandu They won the Campeonato Catarinense Second Level in 1986. Paysandu and Carlos Renaux fused on October 12, 1987 to form Brusque Futebol Clube.

Stadium
Clube Esportivo Paysandu played their home games at Estádio Carlos Renaux.

Achievements

 Campeoanato Catarinense Second Level:
 Winners (2): 1986

References

Defunct football clubs in Santa Catarina (state)
Association football clubs established in 1918
Association football clubs disestablished in 1987
Brusque Futebol Clube
1918 establishments in Brazil
1987 disestablishments in Brazil